The Failure may refer to one of several films:

 The Failure (1915 film), 1915 silent American film directed by Christy Cabanne
 The Failure (1917 film), 1917 silent British film directed by Henry Edwards